Julia Cafritz (born May 5, 1965) is an American musician and guitarist who was a member of Pussy Galore and Free Kitten. She is regarded as a cult figure from the New York City noise music scene of the 1990s.

Early life 
Cafritz was born in Washington, DC, the daughter of Jennifer (née Stats) and Conrad Cafritz, a real estate developer with a personal fortune of over $100 million. She has a younger sister named Daisy von Furth, and two brothers, Eric and Matthew Cafritz. Her grandfather was the multimillionaire real estate developer and philanthropist Morris Cafritz.

Cafritz has a B.A. and M.A. from New York University, having dropped out of Brown University after forming Pussy Galore.

Pussy Galore 
In 1985, guitarist Julia Cafritz and fellow Brown University classmate, Jon Spencer on vocals and guitar, and John Hammill on drums, formed the punk noise band Pussy Galore. In May 1986 they moved to New York City.

STP 
In 1989, Cafritz left Pussy Galore and formed the short-lived all-girl group STP. STP released one single and toured with Nirvana and Sonic Youth. Cafritz joined fellow CBGBs Record Canteen clerk Ned Hayden's group, the Action Swingers.

Free Kitten 
In 1992, she formed Free Kitten, a musical collaboration with Sonic Youth's Kim Gordon, drummer Yoshimi from the Boredoms and Pavement bassist, Mark Ibold. They released records and toured on and off through 1997.

In 2008, Cafritz, Gordon and Yoshimi recorded and released Inherit on Ecstatic Peace Records after a ten-year hiatus.

Free Kitten discography 
Albums:
 1994: Unboxed (Wiiija)
 1995: Nice Ass (Kill Rock Stars)
 1997: Sentimental Education (Kill Rock Stars)
 2008: Inherit (Ecstatic Peace)

EPs
 1992: Call Now (Ecstatic Peace)
 1996: Punks Suing Punks (Kill Rock Stars)

Singles
 1992: "Yoshimi Vs. Mascis" split (Time Bomb)
 1993: "Oh Bondage Up Yours!" (Sympathy for the Record Industry)
 1993: "Lick!" (In The Red)
 1993: "Special Groupie" (SOS)
 1994: "Sex Boy" (Radiation)
 1994: "Harvest Spoon" (Wiiija)
 1997: "Chinatown Express" (Kill Rock Stars)
 2008: "Seasick" (Ecstatic Peace)

Solo work 
In 2012, Cafritz released a track called "dash dash dash" on a Thick Syrup Records Comp Called '78 LTD.

Julie Cafritz solo discography 
 2012: "dash dash dash" on Album '78 LTD (Thick Syrup Records)

Personal life 
Cafritz is married to Bob Lawton of Labor Board and Twin Towers Touring, who was a booking agent to bands like Sonic Youth, Yo La Tengo and Superchunk, among others. In 2000, Cafritz and Lawton relocated to Florence, Massachusetts, where they ran a furniture store called Artifacts 20th Century. They have two children, daughter Alice and son Ollie.

While still playing music, Cafritz has taught English at Holyoke Community College.

See also 
 Pussy Galore
 Free Kitten

Notes and references

External links 
 Julia Cafritz at Allmusic

1965 births
American people of Lithuanian-Jewish descent
Cafritz family
Living people
Singers from Washington, D.C.
Brown University alumni
Pussy Galore (band) members
Noise rock musicians
20th-century American women guitarists
20th-century American guitarists
20th-century American women singers
21st-century American women guitarists
21st-century American guitarists
Women rock singers
American rock guitarists
21st-century American women singers
Free Kitten members
20th-century American singers